Dolbina tancrei is a species of moth of the family Sphingidae.

Distribution 
It is known from the Russian Far East, north-eastern China, the Korean Peninsula and Japan.

Description 
The wingspan is 50–82 mm. It can be distinguished from other Dolbina species by the green wings and body. It differs from most similar species Dolbina exacta by the presence of large black patches and extremely small black dots on the underside of the abdomen. The main distinguishing character however, is the presence of a crescent hook on the aedeagus apex. The abdomen and wings undersides are brownish grey. There are large black mesial patches on the abdomen underside.

Biology 
Adults are on wing from in May and September in two generations in northern China and in two generations with adults on wing from May to June and in August in Russia. In Korea, adults have been recorded from late May to late August.

The larvae have been recorded feeding on Fraxinus and Syringa species in Primorskiy, Ligustrum japonicum, Ligustrum obtusifolium and Fraxinus rhynchophylla in Korea and Ligustrum japonicum, Ligustrum obtusifolium, Olea europaea and Osmanthus fragrans in Japan.

References

Dolbina
Moths described in 1887
Moths of Japan